Şehzade Mahmud Necmeddin Efendi (23 June 1878 – 27 June 1913) was an Ottoman prince, second son of Sultan Mehmed V and his second consort Dürriaden Kadın.

Early life
Şehzade Mahmud Necmeddin was born on 23 June 1878 in the apartment of the crown prince, Dolmabahçe Palace. His father was Mehmed V, son of Abdulmejid I and Gülcemal Kadın, and his mother was Dürriaden Kadın. He was circumcised with Şehzade Abdülkadir, Abdülhamid II’s son.

Public life
On 2 September 1909, Necmeddin travelled to Bursa with his father, Sultan Reşad, and brothers, Şehzade Mehmed Ziyaeddin and Şehzade Ömer Hilmi. On 13 June 1910, he and his brothers received Şehzade Yusuf Izzeddin at the Sirkeci railway station, when he came from a his first visit to Europe. On 5 June 1911, he and other princes received Izzeddin at the station after he came back from his second visit to Europe. Between 5 and 26 June 1911, Necmeddin travelled to Rumelia with his father and brothers.

Personal life
After his father's accession to the throne, Necmeddin was given apartments in the Dolmabahçe Palace, and Yıldız Palace. in 1910, he came into possession of a villa in Kuruçeşme. Here he sponsored a fountain in his mother's name after her death in 1909.

Necmeddin liked music. He was described a person who engaged in conversation, and whose innate intelligence one grasped immediately. He was quite appealing of face, but suffered physical hindrances. He was born with kyphosis, morbidly obese, and his is left ear lay flat against his head. His ill health was of great concern to his mother.

Death

Şehzade Mahmud Necmeddin died of diseases related to the stomach and heart on 27 June 1913, and was buried in the tomb of his father located in Eyüp. His palace in Kuruçeşme passed to his stepmother Kamures Kadın after his death.

Honours
 Order of the House of Osman
 Order of Osmanieh, 1st Class
 Order of the Medjidie, Jeweled
 Hicaz Demiryolu Medal in Gold

Ancestry

References

Sources

1878 births
1913 deaths
Royalty from Istanbul
Ottoman princes